Varadharaja Perumal Temple may refer to:

Varadharaja Perumal Temple, Kanchipuram, a temple in Kanchipuram, Kanchipuram district, Tamil Nadu, India
Varadharaja Perumal Temple, Puducherry, a temple in Puducherry, Tamil Nadu, India
Varadharajaperumal temple, Thirubuvanai, a temple in Thirubuvanai, Puducherry, Tamil Nadu, India
Varadharaja Perumal temple,Thiruvottiyur, a temple in Thiruvottiyur, Thiruvallur district Tamil Nadu, India
Varadaraja Perumal Temple, Poonamallee, a temple in Poonamallee, Thiruvallur district, Tamil Nadu, India
Varadaraja Perumal Temple, Shoolagiri, a temple in Shoolagiri, Krishnagiri district, Tamil Nadu, India
Sri Varadharaja Perumal Kovil, a temple in Tirunelveli, Tamil Nadu, India
Kalyana Varadharaja Perumal Temple, a temple in Sengalipuram, Tiruvarur district, Tamil Nadu, India

See also
Varadaraja (disambiguation)